Conus tiaratus, common name the tiara cone, is a species of sea snail, a marine gastropod mollusk in the family Conidae, the cone snails and their allies.

Like all species within the genus Conus, these snails are predatory and venomous. They are capable of "stinging" humans, therefore live ones should be handled carefully or not at all.

Description
The size of the shell varies between 15 mm and 39 mm.

Distribution
This species occurs in the Pacific Ocean from Southern Mexico to Peru; off the Galapagos Islands.

References

 Bartsch, P. & Rehder, H. A. 1939. Smithson. Misc. Collns. 98 (10): 1, plate 1, figure 4,7.

External links

 The Conus Biodiversity website
 Cone Shells – Knights of the Sea
 

tiaratus
Gastropods described in 1833
Taxa named by George Brettingham Sowerby I